Anatalanta is a genus of Subantarctic flies belonging to the family Lesser Dung flies.

Species
A. aptera Eaton, 1875
A. crozetensis Enderlein, 1908

References

Sphaeroceridae
Brachycera genera
Fauna of subantarctic islands
Fauna of the Kerguelen Islands